The Virgin Suicides (Music from the Motion Picture) is the soundtrack accompanying the 1999 film of the same name. The album, released on March 28, 2000 by Emperor Norton Records, featured music from Todd Rundgren, Boston, Heart, Sloan, The Hollies, Al Green, Gilbert O'Sullivan, 10cc, Styx, and two tracks by Air, which includes a previously recorded material, and an original composition, specially for the film. The album was released in CDs and LP formats.

To coincide with the 20th anniversary of the film's release, a special vinyl edition of the soundtrack – consisting of a two-sided pink splatter disc – was re-issued by Rhino Records on October 24, 2020.

Background 
Sofia Coppola wanted to convey the theme of adolescence in the suburbs in the soundtrack. She did not want to use standard hits from the 1970s music, but opted for a "consistently other-worldly soundtrack" produced by Air, whom Coppola had listened to those tracks while writing the screenplay. She opined that the album, despite being influenced by the 1970s music, also had a modern feel. She found that Air shared many of her suburban memories and experiences even though they grew up in a different country. According to music consultant and former member of Air, Brian Reitzell, he wanted to select songs "that were not the songs that everyone thinks of at first, but ones that are a little more obscure. It was important to strike that intimate chord that transports you back to that period. But we also didn't want to be obvious with our choices. We didn't pick any stoner rock for the film, which is what everyone seems to be doing."

Reception and analysis 

The soundtrack received positive response from critics. Reviewing for AllMusic, Gina Boldman wrote "The soundtrack replays the myriad emotions of adolescence and those of the Lisbon girls in particular." Pitchfork's Mark Richardson wrote, "This soundtrack seeks to replicate the feel of mainstream mid-'70s radio, and to that end, it's a wild success. This is what it sounded like — from the banal pop of 10cc to the raw (okay, medium-rare) power of Heart to the epic romanticism of Styx. Forget disco, CBGB's, punk, and new wave. That stuff didn't play in Peoria until much later. For a real taste of what a suburban kid playing "Space Invaders" was likely to hear pumping over the arcade sound system, this collection is the real thing. The problem is, no one ever said mainstream '70s radio was particularly good. It was like the mainstream radio of any other time, with a few true innovators, a glut of imitators, and a handful of the truly awful. All are represented here in their proper proportions." "The Virgin Suicides is Godin and Dunckel at their best – entirely removed from logic and gleefully, wickedly free to roam their own, unique world."

In a 2021 analysis, Konstantinos Pappis of Our Culture Mag wrote that "what’s certain is that the role of music is more than just affective or nostalgic; it inhabits a complex and often gendered perspective that may either reinforce or offer an alternative to and an escape from the gaze." Clare Nina Norelli of Mubi.com gave a comparative analysis on the film's incorporated music, saying "Within the film, rock and pop songs tether the narrative to the material world both diegetically and non-diegetically, connecting the boys to the Lisbon sisters and locating the action firmly within the film’s mid-1970s setting through its contemporaneous music choices [...] We hear these songs when the sisters give a small party at their home, attend their school dance, and when they engage in a moving telephone exchange with the boys that involves playing records to each other in order to express the inexpressible, allowing the music to speak where they cannot." She further described Air's score as "metaphysical, aligned with the heavens" and further wrote "Through its spacious, soaring, almost hymnal synth harmonies, pulsating rhythms, and bittersweet melodies, their score coveys musically the translucence of memory and invests the ethereal specters of the Lisbon sisters on screen with an added otherworldliness."

Track listing

Personnel 
Credits adapted from the liner notes of The Virgin Suicides.

 Sofia Coppola – cover art, liner notes
 Corinne Day – photography
 Dan Hersh – mastering
 Bill Inglot – mastering
 George McFetridge – design
 Jill Meyers – music business affairs
 Brian Reitzell – music supervisor

Chart performance

Release history

References

2000 albums
Drama film soundtracks
2000s film soundtrack albums